The 1932–33 season was the 35th in the history of the Southern League. The league consisted of Eastern and Western Divisions. Norwich City reserves won the Eastern Division, whilst Bath City won the Western Division. Norwich reserves were declared Southern League champions after winning a championship play-off 2–1.

Three clubs from the Southern League applied to join the Football League, but none were successful.

Eastern Division

A total of 8 teams contest the division, including 7 sides from previous season and one new team.

Newly elected team:
 Aldershot II

Western Division

A total of 11 teams contest the division, including 10 sides from previous season and one new team.

Newly elected teams:
 Newport County II

Football League election
Three Southern League clubs applied for the two election places in the Third Division South of the Football League. However, none were successful as the two League clubs were re-elected.

References

1932-33
4
1932–33 in Welsh football